Seven Year War may refer to:
Seven Years' War (1756–63), among European powers and their colonies, encompassing the French and Indian War
Great Britain in the Seven Years' War
France in the Seven Years' War
Northern Seven Years' War (1563–70), also known as the Nordic Seven Years' War, Sweden against Denmark and allies
Japanese invasions of Korea (1592–98), sometimes referred to in Korean as the "Seven Year war" 
Gunboat War (1807–14), Britain against Denmark and Norway, during the Napoleonic Wars